The 2018 Texas gubernatorial election  took place on November 6, 2018, to elect the governor of Texas, concurrently with the election of Texas's Class I U.S. Senate seat, as well as other congressional, state and local elections throughout the United States and Texas.  Incumbent Republican Governor Greg Abbott won re-election to a second term in office defeating Democratic nominee Lupe Valdez, the former sheriff of Dallas County, and Libertarian nominee Mark Tippetts, a former member of the Lago Vista city council.

The Republican and Democratic party primaries were held on March 6, 2018, making them the first primaries of the 2018 electoral season. Abbott won the March 6 primary with 90% of the vote to receive the Republican nomination, while Democratic candidates Lupe Valdez and Andrew White advanced to a May 22 runoff. Valdez defeated White in the runoff with 53.1% of the vote and faced Abbott in the general election as the Democratic nominee.

Valdez's nomination made her the first openly gay person nominated for governor by a major party in the state.

Tippetts was nominated at the Libertarian Party of Texas' state convention in Houston April 13–15, 2018. He defeated three challengers, as well as the None Of The Above option, on the first ballot and received more than 70% approval from Libertarian party delegates.

Despite considerably closer contests in other Texas state elections, Abbott handily won a second term with the highest margin of victory of any state official on the ballot, although Valdez also won the largest vote share for a Democratic gubernatorial candidate since Ann Richards in 1994.  Tippetts' showing exceeded the previous record for most votes for a Libertarian nominee for Texas governor; that record had been set in 1990.

The election also took place alongside a closer, higher-profile Senate race between Beto O'Rourke and Ted Cruz, which may have played a factor in making the Democratic gubernatorial candidate considerably more competitive than in 2014. Abbott won a majority among white Americans (72% to 26%), while Valdez won majorities among African Americans (80% to 16%) and Latinos (63% to 35%).

Republican primary

Candidates

Nominated
 Greg Abbott, incumbent governor

Eliminated in primary
 Larry Kilgore, secession activist
 Barbara Krueger, retired teacher

Declined
 Dan Patrick, Lieutenant Governor of Texas (running for re-election)
 Joe Straus, Speaker of the Texas House of Representatives

Endorsements

Polling

Results

Democratic primary

Candidates

Nominated
 Lupe Valdez, former Dallas County Sheriff

Eliminated in primary
 James Jolly Clark, businessman
 Cedric Davis, former mayor of Balch Springs
 Joe Mumbach, businessman
 Adrian Ocegueda, financial analyst
 Jeffrey Payne, businessman and 2009 International Mr. Leather
 Demetria Smith, mortgage broker
 Tom Wakely, hospice chaplain and nominee for TX-21 in 2016
 Andrew White, entrepreneur and son of Governor Mark White
 Grady Yarbrough, retired educator

Withdrew
 Garry Brown, candidate for Travis County Commission in 2014
 Lee Weaver

Declined
 Rafael Anchia, state representative 
 Dwight Boykins, Houston City Councilman
 Joaquín Castro, U.S. Representative
 Julian Castro, former United States Secretary of Housing and Urban Development and Mayor of San Antonio
 Mike Collier, businessman and nominee for Comptroller in 2014 (running for Lieutenant Governor)
 Wendy Davis, former state senator and nominee in 2014
 Pete Gallego, former U.S. Representative
 Eva Longoria, actress and political activist
 Jack Martin, CEO of Hill+Knowlton Strategies
 Trey Martinez Fischer, former state representative
 William McRaven, Chancellor of the University of Texas System, retired Navy Admiral and former Commander of the United States Special Operations Command
 Michael Sorrell, president of Paul Quinn College
 Allen Vaught, former state representative

Endorsements

First round

Polling

Results

Runoff

Lupe Valdez and Andrew White proceeded to a run-off on May 22 since neither received 50% of the vote in the first round of the primary. Lupe Valdez won the runoff.

Results

Libertarian nomination

Candidates

Nominated
Mark Tippetts, former Lago Vista City Councilman

Defeated at Convention
 Kathie Glass, attorney and previous nominee
Patrick Smith
 Kory Watkins, activist

General election

Debates
Complete video of debate, September 28, 2018

Endorsements

Predictions

Polling 

with Andrew White

with Julian Castro

with Wendy Davis

Results

By congressional district
Abbott won 25 of 36 congressional districts

References

External links
Candidates at Vote Smart 
Candidates at Ballotpedia

Debates
Democratic Primary Debate, February 13, 2018

Official campaign websites
Greg Abbott (R) for Governor
Mark Tippetts (L) for Governor
Lupe Valdez (D) for Governor

2018 Texas elections
2018
2018 United States gubernatorial elections